Chris Rwabukamba (born January 5, 1987) is a professional Canadian football defensive back for the Edmonton Eskimos of the Canadian Football League (CFL). He was drafted 27th overall by the Hamilton Tiger-Cats in the 2010 CFL Draft and signed with the team on June 1, 2011. He has also been a member of the Edmonton Eskimos. He played college football for the Duke Blue Devils. He was born in Kigali, Rwanda and raised in Windsor, Ontario.

References

External links
BC Lions bio 
Edmonton Eskimos bio 

 

1987 births
Living people
BC Lions players
Canadian football defensive backs
Duke Blue Devils football players
Edmonton Elks players
Hamilton Tiger-Cats players
People from Kigali
Players of Canadian football from Ontario
Rwandan emigrants to Canada
Sportspeople from Windsor, Ontario